Henrik Eriksson may refer to:

 Henrik Eriksson (ice hockey) (born 1990), professional Swedish ice hockey player
 Henrik Eriksson (cross-country skier) (born 1974), Swedish former cross-country skier